The first Azerbaijani diplomatic body, the Ministry of Foreign Affairs, was established in 1918 when Azerbaijan became a republic and Mammad Hasan Hajinski was appointed the first Foreign Affairs minister. The parliament sent a diplomatic delegation to the Ottoman Empire and thus, Turkey became the first country to recognize Azerbaijan's independence, followed by Iran. Azerbaijan was represented at the Paris Peace Conference in 1919. In 1920, the country came under Soviet control and could no longer pursue independent foreign policy. In 1991, after the fall of the Soviet Union, Azerbaijan regained its independence and established bilateral relations with other countries. Today Azerbaijan has over 70 diplomatic missions all over the world.

This is a list of diplomatic missions of Azerbaijan.

Africa

Americas

Asia

Europe

Oceania

Multilateral organisations
  Brussels (Mission to NATO, Mission to the EU)
  Geneva (Permanent Mission to the United Nations Office and Other International Organisations)
  Nairobi (Permanent Mission to the United Nations Office and Other International Organisations)
  Istanbul (Permanent Mission to BSEC)
  Kyiv (Permanent Mission to GUAM)
  New York City (Permanent Mission to the United Nations)
  Ottawa (Permanent Mission to ICAO)
  Paris (Permanent Mission to UNESCO)
  Rabat (Permanent Mission to ISESCO)
  Riyadh (Permanent Mission to OIC)
  Strasbourg (Permanent Mission to the Council of Europe)
  The Hague (Permanent Mission to OPCW)

Gallery

Embassies to open

See also
 Foreign relations of Azerbaijan
 List of diplomatic missions in Azerbaijan

References

Republic of Azerbaijan Ministry of Foreign Affairs  
Republic of Azerbaijan Ministry of Foreign Affairs, List of Diplomatic Missions of Azerbaijan 

 
Azerbaijan
Diplomatic missions